Steg may refer to:

Places
Steg, Liechtenstein, a village in Liechtenstein
Steg, Valais, a village in the Swiss canton of Valais
Steg, Zurich, a village in the Swiss canton of Zurich

Other uses
Steg (video game)
Staats-Eisenbahn-Gesellschaft (StEG), a railway of the Austro-Hungarian Empire
 Tunisian Company of Electricity and Gas, in French: Société tunisienne de l'électricité et du gaz (STEG)